"Acid Rain" is a song recorded by American recording artist Alexis Jordan. It was written by Sia with co-writing and production from Norwegian production outfit StarGate and Dutch disc jockeys (DJs) Bingo Players. The latter duo are credited for the inclusion of a sample of their own electro house single "Get Up (Rattle)". "Acid Rain" initially premiered on January 14, 2013, featuring two verses of Jordan's label-mate, American rapper J. Cole. An alternate version of the song excluding Cole was released for digital download on February 20, 2013.

Background and release 
On June 10, 2011, Jordan released "Hush Hush" as the third and final single from her self-titled debut album. This was followed by her feature on Sean Paul's single "Got 2 Luv U", which was released on July 19, 2011. All the while, she began working on her second album at Roc the Mic studios in New York City with frequent collaborators StarGate. During a video blog released in November, Jordan revealed she had nearly finished the album.

On January 14, 2013, "Acid Rain" premiered online featuring J. Cole. Jordan announced it would be the lead single from her second studio album. It heavily samples the song "Get Up (Rattle)" by Dutch disc jockeys (DJs) Bingo Players. The final version of the song, excluding Cole's two verses, was released as a digital download on February 20, 2013. She performed the song live for the first time at the Miami Music Week party on March 22, 2013.

Chart performance 
On March 2, 2013, it charted in the Netherlands where it debuted at number 99 and peaked, the following week, at 88. It spent only three weeks on the chart. In Belgium it did not achieve enough airplay to reach the top 50, and peaked at 5 in the Flanders Ultratip (equivalent of 55 on the main chart). On the Czech singles chart, the song peaked at 47. In the US, it failed to chart on the Billboard Hot 100, but made an appearance on the dance chart, peaking at number one in May 2013.

Track listing 
Digital download
 "Acid Rain" – 3:36

Charts

Weekly charts

Year-end charts

See also
 List of number-one dance singles of 2013 (U.S.)

References

2013 singles
Roc Nation singles
Alexis Jordan songs
Song recordings produced by Stargate (record producers)
Songs written by Sia (musician)
Dance-pop songs
Songs written by Tor Erik Hermansen
Songs written by Mikkel Storleer Eriksen
Songs written by Maarten Hoogstraten
2013 songs